Blueprints is the debut studio album by American metalcore band Wage War. It was released on November 27, 2015, through Fearless Records. Prior to its release, the band had been through three name changes and an EP called The Fall of Kings when named Empires. On November 13, 2020, the band announced a vinyl re-release for December 4, 2020 including a brand new bonus track to celebrate the album's fifth anniversary. A digital version was released on November 27, 2020.

Track listing

Personnel
Credits adapted from AllMusic.

Wage War
 Briton Bond – unclean vocals
 Seth Blake – lead guitar, backing vocals
 Cody Quistad – rhythm guitar, clean vocals
 Chris Gaylord – bass
 Stephen Kluesener – drums

Additional personnel
 Andrew Wade – composition, engineering, mixing, production
 Jeremy McKinnon – production, composition
 Alan Douches – mastering
 Matt Aure – product management
 Tom Denney – composition
 Sal Torres – A&R
 Chris Kutsor – layout design
 James Land – photography

Charts

References

External links
 
 
 

2015 albums
Wage War albums
Fearless Records albums